Kom is a Kuki-Chin-Mizo language of India. Kohlreng is usually considered a dialect of Kom, but may be a distinct language. Speakers of Kom live in the hilly provinces of Northeastern India. The dialect of Manipur has at least partial mutual intelligibility with the other Kuki-Chin dialects of the area, including Thadou, Hmar, Vaiphei, Simte, Paite, and Gangte languages. Aimol, Koireng and Chiru speakers also understand Kom.

Geographical distribution
Speakers of Kom are found in the northeastern Indian states of Manipur, Nagaland, Assam, and Tripura. The majority of the population lives in eastern and central Manipur, concentrated in 22 villages located in Churachandpur district, Tamenglong district, Senapati district, and Bishenpur district (Ethnologue). In Devi (2011:81), these 22 villages are listed as Sinam Kom, Theiyong Kom, Laikot Kom, Ichum Kom, Kom Keirap, Khoirentak, Sagang, Luikhumbi, Lallumbung, Mantak, Tuiringkhaison, Samulamlan, Chinglanmei, Bungsalane, Lananphai, Ngairong, Mungrushi, Sambangyan, Tonsen tampak, and Khulen.

Devi (2011:80) lists some important Kom villages and localities as:
Makokching, Saikul, and Sinam-Kom of Senapati District
K.R. Lane of Imphal
National Game village of Imphal 
Kharam, Ichum of Imphal West District
Thayong of Imphal East District
Sengpanjar, Kangathai, Khoirentak, and Kom-keirap of Bishnupur District
Greater Sagang of Churachandpur District
Tonsen and Mahou-tera of Chandel District
Mantak of Kakching and Chandel districts

References

Further reading
Kom (India): Kolhreng (Speech variety #12161). (n.d.).

External links
Kom Profile at the Endangered Languages Project
https://www.youtube.com/watch?v=b5CxxM4tvn8

Southern Naga languages
Languages of Manipur
Endangered languages of India
Endangered Sino-Tibetan languages